Euparius marmoreus is a species of fungus weevil in the family of beetles known as Anthribidae. It is found in North America.

References

Further reading

External links

 
 

Anthribidae
Beetles described in 1795